Tierna la Noche is the second album by Mexican pop singer Fey.

The album was released in mid 1996 and quickly climbed the charts to later peak at the top spot. The album stayed there for more than 3 months and stayed in the Top 20 for more than 40 weeks. In sales, the album was quite successful and with time became the highest selling Latin female album of the year, beating out Thalía, Paulina Rubio and other singers already established in the Mexican music scene. "Azúcar Amargo", the album's first single, peaked at #1 in most countries in Latin America, and did fairly well in the U.S. Latin tracks. All the songs in the album received airplay, even though only 2 official videos were made.

The album made the U.S. Latin Albums Top 10 and Fey also had all four of her singles chart within the Latin Tracks Top 20 (Azucar Amargo #8, Muevelo #9, Las Lagrimas de mi Almohada #13 and Subidon #20). It won the Pop Album of the Year at the 1998 Latin Billboard Music Awards.

The album to date has sold more than 4,000,000 copies worldwide.

Track listing

Bonus tracks
Five bonus tracks are available for legal free download on the Fey fan site: http://www.feyelectricidad.com. One is Bitter Sugar, the English version of Azúcar Amargo, and there is a Portuguese version of it called Açúcar Amargo. There is also an English version of Muévelo called Move It, and a Portuguese version of it, Mexe e Remexe. Te Pertenezco is translated only into Portuguese, and is called Ilusǎo Colorida.

Singles

Unreleased Singles
Tierna la Noche was remarkable in that every single song from the album received airplay and charted in the Mexican Top 40, although only eight of the eleven songs were officially released by the label. Tierna la noche, the most successful of these unreleased songs even peaked at number 7. Also receiving large airplay were Bailando Sola and Un Poco Loco.

Tierna La Noche Tour 

Fey went on a nationwide tour in 1996. This tour, Tierna La Noche Tour, was recorded and released on VHS. The track listing consisted of hits and album cuts from her two albums at that point:

 "Múevelo"
 Me Enamoro de Ti
 "Bombón"
 "Gatos en el Balcón"
 "Desmargaritando el Corazón"
 "Tierna la Noche"
 "Te Pertenezco"
 "Bajo el Arcoiris"
 "Subidón"
 "Como Pan y Chocolate"
 "Bailando Bajo la Lluvia"
 "Popocatepetl"
 "Fiebre del Sábado (Rojo Y Blanco)"
 "Media Naranja"
 "Azúcar Amargo"
 "La Noche Se Mueve"
 "Múevelo*"

References

Fey (singer) albums
1996 albums